The Tuvalu Order of Merit is an order of merit of Tuvalu. It was founded on 1 October 2016, on the 38th anniversary of Tuvaluan independence; with $30,000 for the award allocated in the Tuvalu 2017 National Budget.

Discussion of award
At Kensington Palace on 30 October 2017, Prince William received His Excellency Sir Iftikhar Ayaz (Honorary Consul-General of Tuvalu) who invested His Royal Highness  and the then Duchess of Cambridge with the Tuvalu Order of Merit on behalf of the Governor-General of Tuvalu. The award was given to the Prince and Princess of Wales in recognition of their visit to Tuvalu as part of the Diamond Jubilee of Queen Elizabeth II.

Recipients

Tuvalu Order of Merit 
 William, Prince of Wales - 30 October 2017
 Catherine, Princess of Wales - 30 October 2017

Medal of the Tuvalu Order of Merit 
 Major General Alastair Bruce of Crionaich - 19 July 2017

References

Government of Tuvalu
Orders of merit
Awards established in 2016
2016 establishments in Tuvalu
Orders, decorations, and medals of Tuvalu